Belitsaky is a municipality in western Madagascar. It belongs to the district of Maintirano, which is a part of Melaky Region.

Roads
This village is connecte by the hardly praticalbe Nationale Road 1 with Tsiroanomandidy and Maintirano.

Reference 

Populated places in Melaky